Choeradodis rhomboidea, common names tropical shield mantis, hood mantis (or hooded mantis), and leaf mantis, is a species of praying mantis. A native of Central America, C. rhomboidea is a lowland species.

See also 
 List of mantis genera and species

References 

Mantidae
Mantodea of North America
Insects of Central America
Insects of Mexico
Insects described in 1813